On May 4, 1988, a fire followed by several explosions occurred at the Pacific Engineering and Production Company of Nevada (PEPCON) chemical plant in Henderson, Nevada. The disaster caused two fatalities, 372 injuries, and an estimated $100 million of damage. A large portion of the Las Vegas Valley within a  radius of the plant was affected, and several agencies activated disaster plans.

Background
The PEPCON plant, located in Henderson, Nevada,  from Las Vegas, was one of only two American producers of ammonium perchlorate ("AP"), an oxidizer used in solid propellant rocket boosters, including the Space Shuttle, military weapons (SLBMs launched from nuclear submarines), and non-weaponized rocket programs (Atlas, Patriot, etc.). In addition to ammonium perchlorate, the plant produced other perchlorate chemicals including sodium perchlorate. The invoice for this pipe, which was installed in 1956, characterized it as "limited service".

With the Space Shuttle fleet grounded as a result of the January 1986 Space Shuttle Challenger disaster, there was United States Government instruction that the excess product – which was to be used to improve Shuttle launches and which was owned by the U.S. Government or its prime contractors – would be stored in customer-owned aluminum bins as customer-owned material at the PEPCON plant. Ammonium perchlorate manufactured for other United States government programs was not held at the PEPCON plant during this period. High-density polyethylene (HDPE) plastic and steel drums were used for in-process and additional storage at the time of the accident, as they had been for many years prior to the Challenger accident. An estimated 4500 metric tons of the finished product were stored at the facility at the time of the disaster.

Fire and explosions

Several theories have been advanced concerning the cause of the fire and explosions. The Clark County Fire Department (CCFD) in Clark County, Nevada, did not issue a formal report but did issue a two-page press release on July 15, 1988, describing what it believed to be the cause of the fire; this and other CCFD information was incorporated into a report by the United States Fire Administration (USFA).

The United States Department of Labor (USDOL), working with the Division of Occupational Safety and Health (DOSH), issued a lengthy report on the accident that discounted the cause and origin findings of the CCFD. USDOL noted that the Arson Division of CCFD maintained control over the site for several weeks and that DOSH and PEPCON investigating teams were not permitted entry into the facility until 13 days after the event. The first significant DOSH inspection did not occur until 33 days after the fire. At that time, the damaged areas had been disturbed and key evidence had been either displaced or removed from the site.

According to the USFA report, the fire originated around a drying process structure at the plant between 11:30 a.m. and 11:40 a.m. that day. USDOL reported that at least one fire was burning in a barrel located at the west side of the southern portion of the building partition, which separated the batch dryer from the batch tanks in the process building. Fire was also reported on the north wall of the batch dryer section of the process building. A windstorm had damaged a fiberglass structure and employees were using a welding torch to repair the steel frame. The USFA report stated that this activity caused a fire that spread rapidly in the fiberglass material, accelerated by nearby ammonium perchlorate residue.

The USDOL report discounted this theory while relying upon eyewitness testimony and scientific burn tests. Ten people testified that they saw the fire and/or participated in early fire-fighting activities. USDOL reported that testimony indicated that welding operations had taken place somewhere between 30 and 90 minutes prior to the discovery of the fire. These operations took place on the northwest wall of the building; the vicinity was thoroughly washed down prior to and during this task. USDOL stated that the likelihood of transferring hot molten metal a distance of over  through and around batch tanks to the batch dryer was considered extremely remote.

Both the USFA and USDOL reports noted that the flames spread to  plastic drums containing the product that were stored next to the building as employees tried in vain to put the fire out inside the building with water hoses. USFA reported that the first of a series of explosions occurred in the drums about 10 to 20 minutes after ignition, and employees had begun fleeing on foot or in cars. USDOL reported this differently, stating that the fire spread rapidly to the north side of the partition, northeast and south walls by radiative and convective heat transfer. The extremely rapid fire spread in the process building and subsequent growth to other buildings was primarily due to the highly combustible fiberglass reinforced siding panels and close spacing of adjacent buildings. High winds blowing in a northeasterly direction were a contributing factor.

The yield of this first detonation was estimated to be the equivalent of between 17 and 41 kg (37 and 90 pounds) of TNT.

USDOL reported that considerable evidence suggested that natural gas leaks were present in the plant. The on-site investigation of the plant revealed the presence of carbonaceous deposits around the perimeter of the foundation of the batch dryer building. Other visual evidence of burning, possibly natural gas, from the ground was discovered in various portions of the plant including beneath the gas and telephone vaults and portions of the asphalt paving.

USFA reported that the fire continued to spread in the stacks of drums creating a large fireball and leading to the first of four explosions in the drum storage area. USFA reported that the fire then made its way into the storage area for the filled aluminum shipping containers, resulting in two small explosions there, and a massive explosion about four minutes after the first. USDOL reported that six or seven detonations occurred solely in areas where aluminum econo bins or steel drums were utilized to store the product of nominal 200 micron size. USFA reported that little fuel remained after that, causing the flame to diminish rapidly, except for a fireball that was supplied by the high-pressure natural gas line underneath the plant, which had been ruptured by one of the explosions. That gas line was shut off at about 1:00 p.m. by the gas company at a valve about a mile away.

USDOL also reported that there was strong evidence of a natural gas fire prior to the second explosion at the northeast edge of the plant within a  narrow band of soft sand.

USFA reported that there were a total of seven explosions during the accident. Eyewitness testimony and a video, which was filmed by Dennis Todd and began after the first detonation, as well as other resources indicated there were five high-order detonations: one north of the batch dryer, one in the storage area south of the administration building, two on the loading dock and the final largest detonation in the eastern storage area, where the gas line burned after the detonations occurred. The two largest explosions produced seismic waves measuring 3.0 and 3.5 on the Richter scale. A large amount of AP remained on the ground after the incident and material was subsequently recovered and recycled within one year. The largest explosion had an estimated yield of 0.25 kiloton TNT equivalent (similar to a 1.0 kiloton nuclear explosion in free air).

USDOL concluded that the initiation mode of the fire was undetermined. It stated that smoking, sparking of electrical equipment, or frictionally ignited gas are among the probable igniting sources.

About 75 people escaped successfully, but two were killed in the last two larger explosions: Roy Westerfield, PEPCON's controller, who stayed behind to call the CCFD; and Bruce Halker, the plant manager, who stood near his car when the first major detonation occurred. Employees at the nearby Kidd marshmallow factory heard the explosion and also evacuated.

Fire department response

At about 11:54, as he approached the site, the first of the two major explosions sent a shock wave that shattered the windows of his car and showered him and his passenger with glass. The driver of a heavily damaged vehicle coming away from the plant then advised the chief about the danger of subsequent larger explosions, which prompted the chief to turn around and head back toward his station. The other units also stopped heading toward the site after the explosion.

The second major explosion nearly destroyed the chief's car; after he and his passenger were cut by flying glass, he was able to drive the damaged vehicle to a hospital. The windshields of a responding Henderson Fire Department vehicle were blown in, injuring the driver and firefighters with shattered glass.

Several nearby fire departments responded to the accident. Clark County units staged  from the scene and assisted injured firefighters. Recognizing the danger posed by a fire that was beyond their firefighting capabilities, they made no attempt to approach or fight the fire.

Evacuation and overhaul of the scene
The Henderson Police Department, Nevada Highway Patrol, Las Vegas Metropolitan Police Department and the Nevada National Guard evacuated a five-mile (8 km) radius around the plant, concentrating on areas downwind of the explosion. Roads in the area were clogged in both directions due to residents trying to leave and curious spectators headed toward the scene, creating a traffic jam that took over two hours to clear.

More than an hour after the first explosions, authorities concluded that the airborne products could be a respiratory irritant; they were not considered highly toxic, nor was the danger of further explosions estimated as high.

Crews in protective clothing headed to the scene to clean up, a slow process due to leaking tanks of anhydrous ammonia and residue from acids and other products. Several firefighters had to undergo treatment for respiratory irritation. Overhaul continued until dusk and resumed the following day. Authorities found the remains of Bruce Halker, the plant manager, but no trace of the other victim, controller Roy Westerfield, was ever found.

Emergency medical services treated and transported about 100 patients to five hospitals in the region, with the remaining 200 to 300 heading into hospitals on their own volition. Many of the injured had been struck by flying glass when windows were shattered. Fifteen firefighters were injured.

About four hours after the incident, hospitals were advised by the fire department that their disaster plans could be deactivated.

Damage assessment and aftermath
The explosions leveled the PEPCON plant and Kidd & Company marshmallow factory. Damage within a  radius was severe, including destroyed cars, damage to buildings, and downed power lines. Damage to windows and moderate structure damage was recorded within  of the incident.

The shock wave buffeted a Boeing 737 on final approach.

An investigation estimated that the larger explosion was equivalent to 0.25 kiloton of TNT, approximately the same yield of a tactical nuclear weapon.

In 1991, the Nevada legislature passed the Chemical Catastrophe Prevention Act, which led to Nevada's Chemical Accident Prevention Program.

PEPCON had only $1 million in stated liability insurance, but costs paid by its insurer significantly exceeded this amount. A courtroom battle involving dozens of insurance companies and over 50 law firms resulted in a $71 million 1992 settlement  (equivalent to $ in ) with contributions from multiple parties including AMPAC/PEPCON and Southwest Gas Corporation that was divided among insurance companies on subrogation claims as well as the victims and their families.

After the incident, American Pacific Corporation changed the name of the perchlorate chemicals manufacturing subsidiary to PEPCON Production, Inc and within one year, to Western Electrochemical Co. (WECCO). It built a new ammonium perchlorate plant in an isolated area about  outside of Cedar City, Utah with a substantial voluntary no-build buffer around it. Natural gas service to this WECCO facility is handled in a different manner (mostly above ground away from AP storage areas) than was the case at PEPCON. On July 30, 1997, an explosion at that plant killed one and injured four.

As of March 2023, the Henderson site is a commercial development near the Valley Auto Mall which is home to several dealerships and a university.

In popular culture
Footage of the explosion has been shown in the disaster and survival-related documentary-reality television shows:
  The third episode of Discovery Channel's Destroyed in Seconds, aired in August 2008.
 An episode of Blueprint for Disaster features the explosion.
 An episode of Shockwave features the explosion.
 The TLC television special World's Most Powerful Explosions feature the explosion.
  The History Channel television special Engineering Disasters features the explosion.

See also

 List of industrial disasters

References

External links
Western Electrochemical – the company formerly known as PEPCON.
Las Vegas Review-Journal – a special section on the 10th anniversary of PEPCON, including videos.

Explosions in 1988
Explosions in the United States
Disasters in Nevada
1988 industrial disasters
1988 in Nevada
History of Henderson, Nevada
Industrial fires and explosions in the United States
May 1988 events in the United States
1988 disasters in the United States